Beulah Elizabeth Richardson (July 12, 1920 – September 14, 2000), known professionally as Beah Richards and Bea Richards, was an American actress of stage, screen, and television. She was also a poet, playwright, author and activist.

Richards was nominated for an Oscar and a Golden Globe for her supporting role in the film Guess Who's Coming to Dinner in 1968, as well as winning two Primetime Emmy Awards for her guest roles in the television series Frank's Place in 1988 and The Practice in 2000. She also received a Tony Award nomination for her performance in the 1965 production of The Amen Corner.

Early life and education
Beulah Elizabeth Richardson was born in Vicksburg, Mississippi; her mother was a seamstress, and her father was a Baptist minister. In 1948, she graduated from Dillard University in New Orleans, and two years later, she moved to New York City.

She was taught dance by Ismay Andrews.

Career
Her career began in 1955 when she portrayed an 84-year-old-grandmother in the off-Broadway show Take a Giant Step. She often played the role of a mother or grandmother, and continued acting her entire life. She appeared in the original Broadway productions of Purlie Victorious, The Miracle Worker, and A Raisin in the Sun.

As a writer, she wrote the verse performance piece A Black Woman Speaks, a collection of 14 poems, in which she points out that white women played an important role in oppressing women of color. The play's first performance was in 1950 for the organization Women for Peace, a white women's organization in Chicago. Her first play was written in 1951 titled One Is a Crowd about a black singer who seeks revenge on a white man who destroyed her family. It was not produced until decades later.

From the 1930s to the late 1950s, Richards was a member and organizer with the Communist Party USA in Los Angeles after befriending artist Paul Robeson. She is among the Black women who "actively participated in movements affiliated with the CPUSA" between 1917's Bolshevik Revolution and Soviet premier Nikita Khrushchev's 1956 revelations. She was later a sponsor of the National United Committee to Free Angela Davis.

Richards was known professionally as Beah Richards, and is also referred to in several sources as Bea Richards.

Notable movie appearances include The Amen Corner (1965), Guess Who's Coming to Dinner (1967), Hurry Sundown, The Great White Hope, Beloved and In the Heat of the Night.  She appeared in Roots: The Next Generations as Cynthia Murray Palmer, the grandmother of Alex Haley.

She made numerous guest television appearances, including roles on Beauty and the Beast, The Bill Cosby Show, 227, Sanford and Son, Benson, Designing Women, The Facts of Life, The Practice, Murder, She Wrote, The Big Valley and ER (as Dr. Peter Benton's mother.) She was the winner of two Emmy Awards, one in 1988 for her appearance on the series Frank's Place and another in 2000 for her appearance on The Practice.

Recognition and awards
Richards was nominated for a Tony Award for her 1965 performance in James Baldwin's The Amen Corner.

She received a nomination for the Academy Award for Best Supporting Actress for her performance as Mrs. Mary Prentice, Sidney Poitier's mother in the 1967 film Guess Who's Coming to Dinner.

Death and legacy
Richards died from emphysema in her hometown of Vicksburg, Mississippi at the age of 80, just four days after winning an Emmy award.

In the last year of her life, Richards was the subject of a documentary created by actress Lisa Gay Hamilton. The documentary Beah: A Black Woman Speaks was created from over 70 hours of their conversations. The film won the Grand Jury Prize at the AFI Film Festival.

Filmography

References

Further reading
 Radicalism at the Crossroads: African American Women Activists in the Cold War (2011) by Dayo Gore

External links
 
 
 

1920 births
2000 deaths
Actresses from Mississippi
African-American actresses
American film actresses
20th-century American poets
American stage actresses
American television actresses
Deaths from emphysema
Primetime Emmy Award winners
People from Vicksburg, Mississippi
Dillard University alumni
20th-century American actresses
American women poets
American women dramatists and playwrights
20th-century American women writers
20th-century American dramatists and playwrights
Baptists from Mississippi
20th-century Baptists
20th-century African-American women writers
20th-century African-American writers